North Dakota State University first fielded a football team in 1894, among the first 70 universities in the nation to do so. The first game North Dakota State Farmers (until they adopted the Aggies mascot in 1902) played was against future rival, University of North Dakota Flickertails (until they adopted the Fighting Sioux mascot in 1930), North Dakota State won the game 20–4.

North Dakota State officially joined the North Central Conference in 1922 as a founding member. They stayed a member of this conference until 2004 when they moved to Division I (FCS).

The Bison have amassed a 774–378–34 (.667) record since 1894 and have won 17 National Championships, 9 as a member of Division I FCS, and 8 as a member of Division II. NDSU has won 35 Conference Championships, and only have 3 losing seasons since 1964. They have won 9 out of the last 12 FCS National Championships, the most in FCS history.

North Dakota State has won more games than any other FCS school founded after 1876.

Eddie Cochems, known as the 'father of the forward pass', coached North Dakota State from 1902 to 1903, leading them to a 9–1 record and outscoring their opponents 499–49 in two seasons. It is said he experimented with the forward pass at NDSU, but it was not officially legal until 1906.

Seasons

Postseason facts
Years in Postseason: 36 
DII Post-Season Record: 35-13
DI Post-Season Record: 44-4
OVERALL PLAYOFF RECORD: 79-17

Championships
National Championships: 17 (1965, 1968, 1969, 1983, 1985, 1986, 1988, 1990, 2011–2015, 2017–2019, 2021)
National Runner-Up: 4 (1967, 1981, 1984, 2022)
National 3rd Place: 6 (1970, 1976, 1977, 1982, 2000, 2016)

Championships and placings prior to 1973 were determined by AP or UPI polls. Championships and runner-up finishes after that were through the NCAA playoff format. Third-place finishes after 1973 were the result of semifinal losses in the playoff system.

References

 
North Dakota State
North Dakota State Bison football seasons